Eduard Alexander Bello Gil (born 20 August 1995) is a Venezuelan professional footballer who plays as a winger for Liga MX club Mazatlán.

Club career

Yaracuyanos
Born in Cúa, Bello began playing football at the age of four, while also playing baseball. Aged 14, he chose the former sport and joined Yaracuyanos FC's youth setup.

Bello made his first team debut for Yaracuyanos on 22 September 2013, starting in a 2–0 Primera División away loss against Tucanes de Amazonas. He scored his first senior goal the following 19 January, netting his team's first in a 4–2 loss at Deportivo Táchira, and finished the campaign as a starter but suffering team relegation.

Carabobo
On 25 June 2014, Bello moved to fellow top tier side Carabobo FC. After spending his first two campaigns as a backup option, he established himself as a regular in the first team.

Bello scored a brace ain a 3–2 home win against Zamora FC on 17 April 2016, and repeated the feat roughly one year later in a 5–1 away routing of Zulia FC. He ended the 2017 season with nine goals and eleven assists, being regarded as one of the best players in the tournament.

Deportes Antofagasta
On 12 January 2018, Bello moved abroad for the first time in his career, after agreeing to a one-year loan deal with Chilean Primera División side Deportes Antofagasta. He made his debut for the club on 3 February, starting in a 2–1 home loss against Colo-Colo.

Bello scored his first goal abroad on 9 February 2018, netting his team's third in a 3–1 away defeat of Unión La Calera. On 12 April, after two goals in eight matches, he was bought outright and signed a permanent four-year contract.

On 28 October 2018, after scoring a brace in a 3–2 loss at Everton de Viña del Mar and celebrating one of his goals by proposing to his fiancée, Bello suffered an injury which sidelined him for three months. He finished his first season abroad with 13 goals in 26 appearances, being the club's top scorer.

International career
On 15 August 2018, Bello was called up by Venezuela national team manager Rafael Dudamel for friendlies against Colombia and Panama. He made his full international debut on 11 September, coming on as a late substitute for Darwin Machís in a 2–0 win against the latter.

Career statistics

Club

International

References

External links
 
 

1995 births
Living people
People from Cúa
Venezuelan footballers
Association football midfielders
Venezuelan Primera División players
Yaracuyanos FC players
Carabobo F.C. players
Chilean Primera División players
C.D. Antofagasta footballers
Venezuela international footballers
Venezuelan expatriate footballers
Venezuelan expatriate sportspeople in Chile
Expatriate footballers in Chile